The 2010 season was the 115th year in the club's history, the 99th season in Clube de Regatas do Flamengo's football existence, and their 40th in the Brazilian Série A, having never been relegated from the top division.

Club

First-team staff
Updated 4 December 2010.

Other information

First-team squad
As of December, 2010, according to combined sources on the official website.

Players with Dual Nationality
   Juan
   Deivid

Flamengo Youth Team

Professional players able to play in the youth team

Youth players with first team experience

Out on loan

Transfers

In

Out

Statistics

Appearances and goals
Last updated on 4 December 2010.
Players in italic have left the club during the season.

|}

(*) Bruno had his contract suspended due to criminal problems. 
(**) Dejan Petković changed his shirt number from 43 to 10 during the season.

Top scorers
Includes all competitive matches

Clean sheets
Includes all competitive matches

Disciplinary record

Overview

Rio de Janeiro State League

Taça Guanabara

Group A

Matches

Knockout stage

Semifinal

Taça Rio

Group A

Matches

Knockout stage

Semifinal

Final

Copa Libertadores

Group stage

Group 8

Matches

Knockout stages

Round of 16

Quarterfinals

Brazilian Série A

League table

Results summary

Pld=Matches played; W=Matches won; D=Matches drawn; L=Matches lost;

Matches

Honours

Individuals

IFFHS ranking
Flamengo position on the Club World Ranking during the 2010 season, according to IFFHS.

References

External links
Clube de Regatas do Flamengo
Flamengo official website (in Portuguese)
2010 Copa Libertadores page Conmebol.com

Flamengo
2010